The Birth of a Nation: The Inspired by Album is the companion album to the 2016 movie The Birth of a Nation. It was released on Atlantic Records on September 30, 2016, one week prior to the film's theatrical release.

Background 

The album was curated by the film's star and director Nate Parker, Atlantic Records CEO Craig Kallman, and Atlantic Records President of Film & Television Kevin Weaver as a platform for lyrical content inspired by the film's protagonist Nat Turner, an enslaved preacher from Virginia who led a rebellion against slave owners. It 
features a number of prominent R&B and Hip-Hop artists, including Vic Mensa, Nas, Wale, The Game, K. Michelle, Ne-Yo, Pusha T, Gucci Mane, 2 Chainz, Lil Wayne, Meek Mill, and Lecrae.

Track listing 
 credits adapted from the album's digital booklet.

References

Drama film soundtracks
2016 soundtrack albums
Atlantic Records soundtracks